Miri Ichika (未梨一花, Ichika Miri, born 24 February 1999) is a Japanese gravure idol, tarento, and actress from Chiba, Japan. She is under contract with A & A Holdings.

Biography
Ichika said in a 2022 interview that her bust began to grow in middle school, causing her considerable embarrassment. After high school, Ichika worked part-time with no intention of beginning a career in entertainment, feeling herself to be merely "tall and big-breasted" and not beautiful. Scouted by the president of A & A Holdings, who saw potential in her, she made her gravure debut in late 2019 by winning the Sanspo GoGo Queen scouting competition. Her debut DVD, Milky Glamour, appeared that same year.

Since then, Ichika has won multiple awards for her gravure work, including 2021 MVP by Tokyo Lily. In addition to releasing books, DVDs, trading cards and other gravure works, Ichika has made appearances across a variety of media, including radio and broadcast television, as well as appearing on stage.

She has played soft tennis since her youth and enjoys jigsaw puzzles. Ichika is friends with fellow gravure model Aoi Fujino. Her nominal measurements as of 2022 are 100I-63-95 (40I-25-37).

References

External links
 

Japanese gravure idols
Models from Chiba Prefecture
1999 births
Living people